The Unified Modeling Language for Interactive Systems (UMLi) is a conservative extension of the Unified Modeling Language for user interface design. UMLi was developed in the period between 1998 and 2002 as part of Paulo Pinheiro's Ph.D. Thesis at the University of Manchester. UMLi is based on model-based user interface development environments (MB-UIDEs), which provide the capability to design and implement user interfaces in a declarative and systematic way.

References

External links
 https://psemantica.com/umli/

Unified Modeling Language